Chris Kellogg (born May 11, 1972) is an American morning radio host, and a party and wedding dj. In November, 2013, Kellogg was named top air personality for Massachusetts, for the WMAS-FM "Kellogg Krew" morning show by the Massachusetts Broadcasters Association.

Early life and family background 

Kellogg grew up in Suffield, Connecticut, and moved to eight different states hosting radio morning shows.  He attended Suffield High School and graduated before being accepted a place at Ithaca College in Ithaca, New York, where he attended the Roy H. Park school of communications and majored in communication studies.

While he was a college student in Ithaca, New York, Kellogg became a part-time radio DJ at the college radio station, WICB.  Upon graduation, Kellogg earned a night shift at WNKI, Wink 106 in Corning, New York.  Kellogg's hosted his first full-time morning show a year later in Tupelo, Mississippi, at WWKZ.  Kellogg is currently the morning host of The Kellogg Krew on 94.7 WMAS in Springfield, Massachusetts.

Career

The Kellogg Krew Morning Show 

It was while he was working at WCTZ-FM in Norwalk, Connecticut that Kellogg was hired by Citadel Broadcasting after a nationwide search for a new host in 2007.  The Kellogg Krew morning show started on October 15, 2007 with co-hosts Dina McMahon and producer Lopez.  Kellogg has interviewed many celebrities, including Bill Clinton, Martin Short, and a recent interview with Candy Spelling that was featured on Entertainment Tonight, and The Insider.  Kellogg was the first radio host to interview Carrie Underwood after she became the winner of American Idol, Season 4.

TopWeddingDay.com 

Kellogg is the owner and editor-in-chief of the wedding idea website, TopWeddingDay.com.

Film Voice Over 

Kellogg had a short voiceover role in the film Return to Sender, as a radio host.  Kellogg was included in a scene with Aidan Quinn.  The movie also co-starred Kelly Preston and Tim Daly.

Personal life 

Kellogg is involved with various charities, including the Children's Miracle Network.  He has been involved with the organization since 2007.  He is the radio host for the Children's Miracle Network radiothon which is held each year at Baystate Medical Center in Springfield, Massachusetts.

Kellogg was the 2011 M.C. for Geno Auriemma's Fore the Kids Charity Golf Tournament which benefits Connecticut Children's Medical Center.

Chris was married on March 15, 2011 in Jamaica. He has 2 step children, and just had a baby named Olivia who was born March 20, 2012. He and his family lives in Chicopee, MA

References

American radio personalities
American male voice actors
1972 births
Living people
People from Chicopee, Massachusetts
People from Suffield, Connecticut